Ben Macdhui (or Ben Macdui) is the name of two mountains:

 Ben Macdui, a mountain in Scotland
 Ben Macdhui (Eastern Cape), a mountain in South Africa